Farol de D. Luis (also: Farol do Ilhéu dos Pássaros) is a lighthouse on the islet of Ilhéu dos Pássaros, 1.3 km off the coast of the island of São Vicente, Cape Verde. It lies at the entrance to the Porto Grande Bay from the Canal de São Vicente, the strait between São Vicente and Santo Antão. The lighthouse sits atop the highest point of the islet, and is connected to the keepers house halfway down the slope by a stairway. The lighthouse was built around 1882, and was named after king Luís I of Portugal. It is a white hexagonal tower with a small lantern, total height five metres.

See also
List of lighthouses in Cape Verde
List of buildings and structures in São Vicente, Cape Verde

References

External links

D. Luis
Mindelo
Transport in São Vicente, Cape Verde
Portuguese colonial architecture in Cape Verde